Kelly J. McCauley  (born June 23, 1964) is a Canadian politician who was elected to represent the riding of Edmonton West in the House of Commons of Canada in the 2015 federal election.

McCauley is a hospitality executive with over thirty years experience managing hotels and convention centres. He was born and raised in Vancouver and is a graduate of BCIT in the Hospitality Management program.

Electoral record

References

External links

Living people
Members of the House of Commons of Canada from Alberta
Conservative Party of Canada MPs
1964 births
British Columbia Institute of Technology alumni
Businesspeople in the hospitality industry
Businesspeople from Edmonton
Businesspeople from Vancouver
Canadian hoteliers
Politicians from Edmonton
Politicians from Vancouver
21st-century Canadian politicians